Casa de Leones is the eponymous debut album by Puerto Rican reggaeton quintet Casa de Leones and was released on June 26, 2007 by Warner Bros. and Black Lion Records.

Track listing

Disc 1 "Casa de Leones" 
 "Pa' Mi Ponce" (Feat. La India, Arcángel, Ñejo & Dalmata, Voltio) (Written by L. Caballero, M. DeJesus, H. Padilla, C. Crespo, J. Muñoz, J. Bonilla, R. Ortiz) — 5:25
 "Esto Es Perreo" (Written by M. DeJesus, H. Padilla, J. Muñoz, J. Bonilla, R. Ortiz) — 4:08
 "Potrona" (Written by M. DeJesus, H. Padilla, J. Muñoz, J. Bonilla, R. Ortiz) — 3:14
 "Trambo" (Written by M. DeJesus, H. Padilla, J. Muñoz, J. Bonilla, R. Ortiz) — 4:29
 "Dale con Presión" (Written by M. DeJesus, H. Padilla, J. Muñoz, J. Bonilla, R. Ortiz) — 3:37
 "Shorty" (Randy) (Written by J. Muñoz, R. Ortiz) — 4:06
 "A Veces Pienso" (Written by M. DeJesus, H. Padilla, J. Muñoz, J. Bonilla, R. Ortiz) — 4:32
 "Biggie Booty Lady" (Written by M. DeJesus, H. Padilla, J. Muñoz, J. Bonilla, R. Ortiz) — 4:31
 "No Te Veo" (Written by J. Bonilla, M. DeJesus, J. Muñoz, H. Padilla, R. Ortiz) — 4:48
 "Ponte Ahí" (Written by J. Bonilla, M. DeJesus, J. Muñoz, H. Padilla, R. Ortiz) — 5:04
 "Listen to Me Baby" (Written by M. DeJesus, H. Padilla, J. Muñoz, J. Bonilla, R. Ortiz) — 3:50
 "There's No Reason" (Written by M. DeJesus, H. Padilla, J. Muñoz, J. Bonilla, R. Ortiz) — 3:50
 "Yo Sé" (Guelo Star) (Written by M. DeJesus) — 2:47
 "Qué Pasó Yal" (Written by M. DeJesus, H. Padilla, J. Muñoz, J. Bonilla, R. Ortiz) — 3:26

Disc 2 "Jowell & Randy" 
 "Sácala a Bailar" 
 "Dos Palgas" 
 "Soltura"  
 "Te Ando Buscando" (V. Felix, J. Muñoz, R. Ortiz) — 3:24
 "Eh Oh Eh Oh" (J. Muñoz, S. S. Rivera, R. Ortiz) — 3:34
 "Que Te Vaya Bien" (Randy) (M. A. DeJesus, R. Ortiz) — 4:02
 "Velándote" (J. Muñoz, R. Ortiz) — 3:58
 "Ese Amor" (J. Muñoz, R. Ortiz) — 3:39

Charts

Certifications

References 

Jowell & Randy albums
2007 debut albums